Kinleith is a rural settlement in the South Waikato District and Waikato region of New Zealand's North Island. It includes the Kinleith Mill.

History
The estimated population of Kinleith reached 1,190 in 1996, 1,130 in 2001, 1,150 in 2006, 1,540 in 2013, and 2,440 in 2018.

Demography

There was a population density of 1.60 people per km2 in 2009.

As of the 2018 census, the median age was 30.0, the median income was $42,400,  9.3% of people earned over $100,00, 14.2% had a bachelor's degree or higher, and 3.5% of the workforce was unemployed.

Ethnically, the population was 83.6% New Zealand European, 19.5% Māori, 2.7% Pacific peoples, and 8.5% Asian; 17.0% were born overseas. Religiously, the population was 56.0% non-religious and 32.0% Christian.

Economy
In 2018, 52.6% of the workforce worked in primary industries, 9.6% worked in manufacturing, 4.0% worked in construction, 4.8% worked in education, 3.7% worked in transport, and 3.3% worked in healthcare.

Transportation
As of 2018, among those who commuted to work, 42.3% drove a car, 1.5% rode in a car, 0.8% walked, ran or cycled.

References

South Waikato District
Populated places in Waikato